Williams is the remnant of a lunar impact crater that lies to the south of the prominent crater Hercules, in the northeastern part of the Moon. The southern rim borders the Lacus Somniorum, a small lunar mare that extends to the south and west. To the southwest is the sharp-rimmed crater Grove.

Little remains of the original crater, besides a low curving ridge. The rim has been nearly destroyed along the northwest face, leaving only a few ridges in the surface. The remainder forms an irregular horseshoe, with the western part attached to a series of ridges leading to the west. The interior floor has been resurfaced by basaltic lava, forming a flat, nearly featureless surface that is marked only by a pair of tiny craters near the northeast rim.

Satellite craters 

By convention these features are identified on lunar maps by placing the letter on the side of the crater midpoint that is closest to Williams.

References 

 
 
 
 
 
 
 
 
 
 
 
 

Impact craters on the Moon